John Michael Gremillion (born 1967) is an American stage and voice actor who has worked for Funimation, Seraphim Digital/Sentai Filmworks, and Okratron 5000. He has provided voices for a number of English-language versions of Japanese anime series and video games; notable credits include Gentle Criminal from My Hero Academia, Dracule Mihawk from One Piece, Roland Chappelle from Food Wars, Arthur Randall from Black Butler, Go Mutsugi from Area 88, Yamato Hotsuin from Devil Survivor 2: The Animation, and Hakuoro from Utawarerumono.

He attended the University of Texas at Austin film school and studied drama at the Juilliard School.

Filmography

Anime
1999
 Bubblegum Crisis Tokyo 2040 - Motoslave, Nigel Kirkland
 Martian Successor Nadesico - Admiral Sadake Munetake, Gekiganger Narrator, Genhachiro Akiyama
 Those Who Hunt Elves - Pierre
2000
 Gasaraki - Tamotsu Hayakawa, Capt. Raiko
 Street Fighter II V - Narrator (ADV dub)
2001
 Princess Nine - Hidehiko Hayakawa, Vice-Principal Kodanuki
 Sorcerous Stabber Orphen - Rox Roe
2002
 Chance Pop Session - Sho Kaibara
 Excel Saga - Kitayama, Aesop (Ep. 11), Additional Voices
2003
 Aura Battler Dunbine - Todd Guinness
 Dirty Pair: Affair of Nolandia - Oran
 Full Metal Panic! - Colonel Estes (Ep. 19), Goddard, Olmos (Ep. 18), Koh
 Magical Shopping Arcade Abenobashi - Kouhei, Masayuki Asahina (Young)
 Martian Successor Nadesico: The Motion Picture - Prince of Darkness - Sadake Munetake, Genharchiro Akiyama
 Noir - Doctor, Guerrilla (Ep. 7)
 Neo Ranga - Kageyama the Reporter, Mr. Aosaka, Unbo the Elder, Fuchizaki (Ep. 41-44)
 Rahxephon - Jin Kunugi 
 Rune Soldier - Conrad, Jakinson
 Saint Seiya - Gigas, additional voices 
 Saiyuki - Soutou (Ep. 22)
 Super GALS! - Taizo Kotobuki, Fukuroda (Ep. 11), Hideki (Ep. 8), Suganuma (Ep. 16)
2004
 Case Closed - Matthew Kohler (Ep. 113-114)
 Chrono Crusade - Jack Gilliam, Vincent Lerajie
 Cyberteam in Akihabara - Principal Ryugasaki
 D.N.Angel - Kyle, Police Chief Hiwatari
 Fullmetal Alchemist series - Roa (Law), Gartner
 Megazone 23 - Lieutenant Yuichiro Shiratori (Part II)
 Peacemaker Kurogane - Toshimaru Yoshida
 Puni Puni Poemy - Mr. Kitayama
 Slayers Gorgeous - Lord Culvert
2005
 Area 88 - Makoto Shinjou
 Cromartie High School - Yutaka Takenouchi
 Divergence Eve - Luke Walker
 E's Otherwise - Edgar Hanson
 Full Metal Panic? Fumoffu - Takigawa, Mr. Kogure, Jindai
 Gantz - Genju Kannon (Ep. 25), Juzo Togo, Ryuji Kajiura
 Gilgamesh - The Steward
 Godannar - Ken, Lou Roux
 Hakugei: Legend of the Moby Dick - Speed King
 Kodocha - Takeshi Gojo
 Maburaho - Shunji Kamashiro
 Madlax - Charlie
 Mythical Detective Loki Ragnarok - Misao Daidoji, Hideki Takaya
 Samurai Gun - Geki
 Science Ninja Team Gatchaman - Arthur (Ep. 46), Bob Barker (Ep. 74), Captain Francis 7, Koji (Ep. 56), Additional Voices (ADV Dub)
 Tree of Palme - Voice of Soma
 Yumeria - Mister Ishikari
2006
 Bakumatsu Kikansetsu Irohanihoheto - Hijikata Toshizo
 Basilisk: The Kōga Ninja Scrolls - Muroga Hyouma
 Desert Punk - Koji Okawa
 Full Metal Panic! The Second Raid - Alastor, Jun-Gyu, Yang
 Fullmetal Alchemist: The Conqueror of Shamballa - Huskisson
 Guyver: The Bioboosted Armor - Commander Gregole, Detective Vamore (Ep. 2), Misawa, Officer Johnson (Ep. 1), Sin
 Jinki: Extend - Hakuya (Ep. 12), Kokusho, The Chief
 Nerima Daikon Brothers - Yakuza Boss (Ep. 4)
 Shadow Skill - Klack
 Speed Grapher - Otsuka (Ep. 2), Hashimoto (Ep. 9)
 The Super Dimension Fortress Macross - Vrlitwhai Kridanik
 Tactics - Raiko Minamoto
 Trinity Blood - Cardinal Francesco de Medici
 Witchblade - Muraki
 Yugo the Negotiator - Lt. Col. Shekin
2007
 009-1 - Ivan Godunov (Ep. 1)
 Air - Keisuke Tachibana
 Air Gear - Gonzo, Inuyama, Yasuyoshi Sano
 Best Student Council - Kazuhiro Kinjo
 Le Chevalier D'Eon - Conte di Cagliostro
 Coyote Ragtime Show - Allen, Bruce
 Glass Fleet - Theodoric
 Hell Girl - Takashi Murai (Ep. 21-22)
 Innocent Venus - Steve
 Kurau: Phantom Memory - Dr. Hajime Amami
 One Piece - Dracule "Hawkeye" Mihawk (Funimation dub)
 Pani Poni Dash! - Saotome
 Pumpkin Scissors - Hosslo (Ep. 2)
 SoltyRei - Dale Boyd (Ep.1)
 Tokyo Majin - Morihito Inugami, Doshin Narasaki
 Utawarerumono - Hakuoro, Dii
 The Wallflower - Kinoyama (Ep. 5), Ranmaru's Father (Ep. 14)
 Xenosaga: The Animation - Gaignun Kukai, Albedo Piazzolla
2008
 Appleseed Ex Machina - Dr. Riharuto Kestner
 Darker than Black - Kenneth (Ep. 3-4)
 Devil May Cry: The Animated Series - Michel (Ep. 2)
 The Galaxy Railways - Schwanhelt Bulge
 Moonlight Mile - Lostman
2009
 D.Gray-man - Vittorio (Ep. 16-17)
 Kenichi: The Mightiest Disciple - Hoshino
 Kiba - Kemp
 Nabari no Ou - Hideo Nowake (Ep. 7-8, 21)
 Shigurui: Death Frenzy - Nobumasa Asakura (Ep. 1)
2010
 Eden of the East - Daiju Mononobe
 Ghost Hound - Takashi Nire
 Halo Legends - Fal (The Duel), Arthur (The Package)
 Legends of the Dark King: A Fist of the North Star Story - Dagale
 Tears to Tiara - Creon, Edith, Myrddin, Narrator
2011
 Black Butler - Arthur Randall, Havoc (Ep. 17)
 Coicent - Company President Mama
 Golgo 13 - Various Voices
 Five Numbers! - N35 (Middle-Age Man/Pinch-Hitter)
 Highschool of the Dead - Matsudo
 Night Raid 1931 - Kazura Iha 
2012
 The Book of Bantorra - Machia, Vexile
 Horizon in the Middle of Nowhere - Tenzo Crossunite (Season 1), Nenji (Season 1), Noriki (Season 1), Francis Drake (Season 2), Hassan Fullbrush (Season 2)
 Intrigue in the Bakumatsu - Irohanihoheto - Toshizo Hijikata
 Panty & Stocking with Garterbelt - Cocktimis Prime (Ep. 7A)
2013
 Phi Brain: Puzzle of God - Bishop
 Rurouni Kenshin - New Kyoto Arc - Shinomori Aoshi
2014
 Devil Survivor 2: The Animation - Yamato Hotsuin
 Log Horizon - Karashin, Kazuhiko
 Majestic Prince - Giuliano Visconti, Shinjiro
2015
 Akame ga Kill! - Liver
 Dog & Scissors - Toji Nakahara
 Dramatical Murder - Toue
 Parasyte - Takeshi Hirokawa
 Vampire Hunter D - D (Sentai Filmworks dub)
2016
 Hanayamata - Masaru Ofuna
 Re: Hamatora - Shunichi Ishigami
2017
 Food Wars!: Shokugeki no Soma - Roland Chapelle
 Haikyū!! - Nobuteru Irihata
 Is It Wrong to Try to Pick Up Girls in a Dungeon? - Ottarl
2020
 My Hero Academia - Danjuro Tobita/Gentle Criminal
 Shirobako - Masahiko Inami
2021
 Vinland Saga - The Ear, Halfdan
 The Heike Story - Taira no Shigemori
2022
 Kakegurui ×× - Jomaru, Announcer
 My Isekai Life - Proudwolf
 Reincarnated as a Sword - Elevent

References

External links
 
 
 

American male voice actors
Living people
Juilliard School alumni
Moody College of Communication alumni
High School for the Performing and Visual Arts alumni
1967 births